The GETEC Arena (until 2011: "Bördelandhalle") is an indoor sporting arena located in Magdeburg, Germany.  The maximum capacity of the arena is 8,071 people for handball games and 8,820 for boxing matches.  It is the current home to SC Magdeburg's Handball-Bundesliga team.

External links 
Fair- and Event-Company Magdeburg (Proprietor) (German language)

Handball venues in Germany
Indoor arenas in Germany
Buildings and structures in Magdeburg
Sports venues in Saxony-Anhalt
Tourist attractions in Magdeburg